The 17th International Emmy Awards took place on November 20, 1989 in New York City. The award ceremony, presented by the International Academy of Television Arts and Sciences (IATAS), honors all programming produced and originally aired outside the United States.

Ceremony 
The International Emmy Awards are given by the International Council of the National Academy of Television Arts and Sciences. In addition, special awards were given to Ted Turner who received the International Council's Directorate Award, and Paul Fox, who was given the Founder's Award.

Winners

Best Children & Young People 
 My Secret Identity (Canada: CTV Television Network)

Best Drama 
Traffik (United Kingdom: Channel 4)

Best Documentary 
Four Hours in My Lai  (United Kingdom: Yorkshire Television)

References

External links 
 

International Emmy Awards ceremonies
International
International